The ocean surgeon or ocean surgeonfish (Acanthurus bahianus) is a tropical fish known to live in reefs in the Atlantic Ocean off the coast of Brazil. It is sometimes marketed as a food item, but it is more often used as bait, or in tropical saltwater aquaria.

Description
Ocean surgeons are known by their oval bodies with uniform color (usually blue-gray to dark brown), the pale to dark marking around the eyes, and the light yellow is now found on their bodies. Most have blue or white markings on the dorsal fin, anal fin, and tail fins and pale bands can sometimes be seen at the base of their tails. They often swim in schools with other species such as the Atlantic blue tang surgeonfish.
Ocean surgeons have a total of 9 spines on their dorsal fins and between 23 and 26 soft rays. Their anal fins have only 3 spines and between 21 and 23 rays. Their caudal fins are roughly emarginate, and the surgeonfish's body and head are both deep and compressed.

Distribution and habitat
Ocean surgeons inhabit coral reefs, where they feed on algae. In the southern and central Atlantic, the Ocean surgeon can be found along the coast of Brazil from the states of Maranhão, south to Stanta Caterinha. This range includes many islands such as Fernando de Noronha, Atol das Rocas, Trindade, Ascension Island, and St. Helena.

References

External links
 

ocean surgeon
Fish of the Western Atlantic
Taxa named by François-Louis Laporte, comte de Castelnau
ocean surgeon